Jamie-Lee Kriewitz (born 18 March 1998), better known by the mononym Jamie-Lee, is a German singer and activist. Born and raised in Bennigsen, Hanover, she performed as a member of the German children choir Joyful Noise before auditioning for the fifth season of The Voice of Germany in 2015. She competed as one of the seventeen composing members of Team Michi & Smudo and later emerged as the winner after garnering 38% of the public vote. Kriewitz's debut and winner's single, "Ghost", peaked at number 11 on the GfK Entertainment Charts, number 65 in the Ö3 Austria Top 40 and number 26 on the Swiss Hitparade. She subsequently signed a recording contract with Universal Music Group; her debut studio album Berlin was released on 29 April 2016 and peaked at number 18 on the GfK Entertainment Charts.

Following Xavier Naidoo's disqualification, Kriewitz was announced as one of the ten finalists for Unser Lied für Stockholm, Germany's preliminary decision for their representative at the Eurovision Song Contest 2016, in 2016. She competed with her debut and winner's single "Ghost" and later emerged as the winner after garnering 44.5% of the public vote. Kriewitz then represented Germany in the Eurovision Song Contest 2016, where she placed twenty-sixth in the final, scoring 11 points: 10 points from the televoting and 1 point from the juries. Her placement became Germany's second consecutive time at last place since Lena's win with her song "Satellite" in 2010, the first being Ann Sophie with her song "Black Smoke", whom placed twenty-seventh and scored null points in 2015.

Life and career

1998–2015: Early life and career 

Jamie-Lee Kriewitz was born in Bennigsen, Hanover on 18 March 1998 to Michael Kriewitz, a former drummer for the German punk rock band 3Zylinder, and Nicole Kriewitz. She has an older brother named Joey. At the age of 12, Kriewitz became a member of the German children choir Joyful Noise. At the age of 14, she became a vegan. Kriewitz originally intended to pursue a degree in Korean studies before deciding to pursue a career as a musician.

In 2015, Kriewitz successfully auditioned for the fifth season of The Voice of Germany, singing "The Hanging Tree" by James Newton Howard and Jennifer Lawrence. She persuaded all four coaches to turn their chairs and chose to compete as one of the 17 composing members of Team Michi & Smudo. Kriewitz progressed to the battle rounds and was paired against Meike Rosendahl, singing "Royals" by Lorde and was saved by her coach. She made it to the knockout rounds, where she sang "Berlin" by RY X and was saved by her coach once again. During the live rounds, Kriewitz sang "Lights Will Guide Me" by Fahrenhaidt and was saved by her coach for the third consecutive time. On 2 December, the music video for her winner's single, "Ghost", premiered on the Digster On Stage's official YouTube channel. For the semi-final, Kriewitz sang "Warriors" by Imagine Dragons and was saved by the public vote. During the grand final, she was required to perform three songs – a duet with her coaches ("Name drauf"), a duet with a singer ("Take Me Home") and the winner's single ("Ghost"). Kriewitz was later announced as the winner after garnering 38% of the public vote.

After emerging as the winner of the fifth season of The Voice of Germany, Kriewitz's debut and winner's single, "Ghost", peaked at number 11 on the GfK Entertainment Charts, number 65 in the Ö3 Austria Top 40 and number 26 on the Swiss Hitparade. She subsequently signed a recording contract with Universal Music Group. Kriewitz then embarked on The Voice of Germany: Live in Concert concert tour with 8 other finalists, which ran from 27 December 2015 in Hof, Bavaria to 13 January 2016 in Hamburg, Germany.

Performances on The Voice of Germany 
 denotes a performance that entered the charts denotes winner

2016–present: Eurovision Song Contest and Berlin 

2016 for Kriewitz began with an announcement which presented "Ghost" (2015), previously released as her debut and winner's single, as one of the ten finalists of Unser Lied für Stockholm, the German national competition held in search for their representative in the sixty-first edition of the Eurovision Song Contest. Prior to the competition, Xavier Naidoo was originally intended to be their representative after an internal selection, although numerous controversies which involved him ultimately resulted in his withdrawal. "Ghost" was drawn as the ninth performance of the first round, later advancing to the subsequent round after accumulating 28.78 percent of the public vote.  It ultimately achieved the winning title after accumulating the highest number of votes with 44.5 percent from the public. The compilation album of the sixty-first edition of the competition titled Eurovision Song Contest: Stockholm 2016, released on 15 and 22 April digitally and physically respectively, featured "Ghost" on its first disk.

Kriewitz's debut studio album titled Berlin, released on 29 April, peaked at number eighteen on the GfK Entertainment Charts. It produced two singles; "Ghost" was previously released in December 2015, which served as her winner's and debut single following her emergence as the winner of the fifth season of The Voice of Germany. It went on to peak at number eleven on the GfK Entertainment Charts and has made a notable appearance on the Ö3 Austria Top 40 and the Swiss Hitparade at number sixty-four and twenty-six respectively. "Wild One" was released in September 2016, however it failed to match the success of its predecessor. She then embarked on her second headlining tour in order to further promote Berlin, which ran from 19 October through 20 April 2017.

In the Eurovision Song Contest, Kriewitz automatically advanced to the final since Germany was among the countries included in the "Big Five" rule. "Ghost" was drawn as the tenth performance of the final, where it later finished last after accumulating eleven points; it received one point from the national jury and ten points from the televoting. In an interview with Barbara Schöneberger, who previously presented Unser Lied für Stockholm, she told her: "Well, of course I'm a little sad that it actually happened and I finished last. But I personally don't think it's my fault and I was really satisfied with my performance." Kriewitz was then selected as the cover girl of the Welt Vegan magazine for their June 2016 issue, where it held a raffle for a copy of Berlin for five winners. Later that month, she served as a member of the national jury for 2016 KWF Audition In Berlin, a German national competition in search for their representative in the sixth edition of the K-Pop World Festival.

2017 saw the release of "Jetzt erst recht!", a collaboration between Kriewitz and Fargo. It served as the opening theme of the Song Contest Eineweltsong.

Activism 
Kriewitz is an animal rights activist. She collaborated with the People for the Ethical Treatment of Animals for their "Vegan life is the best life" project, where her Japanese decora kei-inspired outfit and an autographed poster was auctioned. During an interview with PETA, Kriewitz explained her perspective on equality of all living things by saying: "The difference between the dog and pork is simply not for me - it is inhumane, animals that cannot defend themselves to abuse. I take my responsibility for all animals too seriously and would also say 'no' to leather, wool and animal experiments."

Discography
 Berlin (2016)

Concert tours 
Headlining
The Voice of Germany: Live in Concert (2016)
Berlin Tour (2016)

Awards and nominations

References

External links 

 
 Jamie-Lee Kriewitz on the Universal Music Group website.

1998 births
Eurovision Song Contest entrants of 2016
Eurovision Song Contest entrants for Germany
German women pop singers
Living people
Musicians from Hanover
The Voice (franchise) winners
Winner05
German veganism activists
German child singers
English-language singers from Germany
21st-century German women singers